Paul Martin Laaveg (born October 1, 1948) is a former American football offensive lineman in the National Football League for the Washington Redskins.  He played college football at the University of Iowa and was drafted in the fourth round of the 1970 NFL Draft.

1948 births
Living people
American football offensive guards
American football offensive tackles
Washington Redskins players
Iowa Hawkeyes football players
Sportspeople from Sioux Falls, South Dakota
Players of American football from South Dakota